Timici was a Phoenician, Numidian, and Roman town located in present-day Ain Matboul, Algeria
 (between Sidi M'hamed Ben Ali and Taougrit).

Name

-Timici is a latinization of the town's Punic name .

-Timici means fire in tamazight

History
Timici minted its own bronze coins with Punic legends.

Under the Romans, Timici was a native town in the province of Mauretania Caesariensis.

The town was previously identified with the ruins at Aïn Témouchent, which were actually the remnants of Roman Albulae.

Religion
Timici was the seat of a Christian bishop in antiquity. Three of them appear in the surviving historical record. The title fell into abeyance during the Islamic conquest of the Maghreb but was revived as a Roman Catholic titular see in the 20th century.

List of bishops

 Vitorre a Catholic bishop who represented the town at the Council of Carthage (411), which heard the dispute between Catholic and Donatists. 
 the Donatist Optato was Vittores' counterpart at the conference. 
 Honorius participated in the synod assembled in Carthage in 484 by King Huneric of the Vandal Kingdom, after the synod Honorius was exiled.
 Fernando Ariztía Ruiz (1967–1976)
 Ramón Darío Molina Jaramillo (1977–1984)
 Toribio Ticona Porco (1986–1992) 
 Francisco Cases Andreu (1994–1996)
 John Forrosuelo Du (1997–2001)
 Donald George Sproxton (2001–current), Perth's auxiliary bishop.

References

Citations

Bibliography
 . 
 .

Phoenician colonies in Algeria
Roman towns and cities in Mauretania Caesariensis
Catholic titular sees in Africa
Former Roman Catholic dioceses in Africa
Ancient Berber cities